Kentucky Senate Bill 47 is a bill introduced in the 2023 session of the Kentucky General Assembly that would create a medical cannabis program in the state.

History
House Bill 136 in the 2022 session would have created a medical cannabis program. It was passed by the house of representatives 59–34 on March 17, 2022. 

The governor of Kentucky, Andy Beshear, said on April 7, 2022 that he was considering executive action to permit medical cannabis in his state if House Bill 136 was not approved in the state senate. When the session ended without senate consideration of the bill, Beshear issued executive order 2022-338 on June 14, 2022 that created the Kentucky Medical Cannabis Advisory Committee to provide recommendations on ways forward for medical cannabis. The advisory committee held its first meeting on June 20.

Governor Beshear asked the state legislature to create a legislatively authorized medical program, after some degree of opening the door to one in 2022 via his own executive order. Senate Bill 47 to create a medical cannabis program cleared a committee on March 14, prior to Senate readings. It was the first time a legalization bill had received a state senate hearing. The bill was approved 26-11 by the senate on March 16. It received its first reading in the house the same day. Passage in the house is widely expected before the session ends on March 30.

See also

Cannabis in Kentucky

References

External links
SB47 bill history and details at Kentucky General Assembly

Cannabis in Kentucky
Kentucky law
Proposed laws of the United States